The Flettner 184 was a German night reconnaissance and anti-submarine autogyro developed during the 1930s.

Design 
The Fl 184 was a two-seat autogyro with an enclosed cabin. The Fl 184 rotors had a length of 12 m and a cyclic pitch control system. The aircraft's power was supplied by a  Siemens-Halske Sh 14A radial engine that drove a two-bladed wooden propeller.

Operational history 
The sole Fl 184, given the registration D-EDVE, was scheduled to be tested for night reconnaissance in late 1936. However, before these tests could take place, it caught fire whilst in flight and crashed.

After the crash the entire program was cancelled and no more aircraft were manufactured.

Specifications

References

Further reading

External links

World War II helicopters of Germany
Single-engined tractor autogyros
1930s German helicopters
Flettner aircraft